Jorge Humberto Torres Mata (born August 27, 1962, in Guadalajara, Jalisco) is a Mexican football manager and former player.

External links

1962 births
Living people
Footballers from Guadalajara, Jalisco
Mexican football managers
Mexican footballers
Association football forwards
Atlas F.C. managers